Rastaman Vibration is the eighth studio album by Jamaican reggae band Bob Marley and the Wailers, released in April 1976.

Critical reception
Reviewing for Rolling Stone in 1976, Robert Palmer said that on the album Marley consummately performs "a dual role as spokesman for the Third World's disadvantaged and avatar of a highly commercial brand of popular music". While lacking the forceful, intricate quality of the Wailers' past line-up, "the sensitive, careful listener will learn from Rastaman Vibration something of the pain, rage and determination of Shantytown, Jamaica, and perhaps something of the community's political and cultural fragmentation as well", Palmer concluded.

Village Voice critic Robert Christgau said if the record's first side "makes it seem that reggae has turned into the rasta word for boogie—even to a Trenchtown tragedy recited with all the toughness of an imprecation against litter—the unimpassioned sweetness of most of side two sounds like a function of reflective distance, assured in its hard-won calm. Some of it's even better."

The singer Bilal names it among his 25 favorite albums, citing the production's handling of "different rock guitar lines and organ lines".

Commercial performance
Rastaman Vibration was a great success in the US, becoming the first Bob Marley release to reach the top 10 on the Billboard 200 chart (peaking at number eight), in addition to releasing Marley's most popular US single "Roots, Rock, Reggae", the only Marley single to reach the Billboard Hot 100 chart, peaking at number 51. Synthesizers are featured prominently on Rastaman Vibration, adding a breezy embellishment to otherwise hard-driving songs with strong elements of rock guitar. This is one of the three Wailers solo albums released in 1976, along with Blackheart Man by Bunny Wailer and Legalize It by Peter Tosh.

Songwriting credits
Although the album's liner notes list multiple songwriters, including family friends and band members, all songs were written by Marley. Marley was involved in a contractual dispute at the time with his former publishing company, Cayman music. Marley had not wanted his new songs to be associated with Cayman and it was speculated, including in his obituary in The Independent, that he had put them in the names of his friends and family members as a means of avoiding the contractual restrictions and to provide lasting help to family and close friends.

Vincent Ford, a childhood friend from Jamaica, is credited as the songwriter for "No Woman, No Cry" on the 1974 album Natty Dread, as well as the songs "Crazy Baldheads" (with Marley's wife Rita), "Positive Vibration" and "Roots Rock Reggae" from Rastaman Vibration, along with "Inna De Red" and "Jah Bless" with Marley's son, Stephen.

Marley's widow and his former manager Danny Sims sued to obtain royalty and ownership rights to the songs, claiming that Marley had actually written the songs but had assigned the credit to Ford to avoid meeting commitments made in prior contracts. A 1987 court decision favored the Marley estate, which assumed full control of the songs.

Track listing

Personnel
Bob Marley and the Wailers
Bob Marley – vocals
Earl "Chinna" Smith – guitar, percussion
Al Anderson – guitar
Carlton Barrett – drums
Aston Barrett – bass guitar
Jean Alain Roussel – Hammond Organ on "Positive Vibrations" and "Roots, Rock, Reggae"
Tyrone Downie – keyboards
with:
I Threes – backing vocals
Tommy McCook – saxophone on "Roots, Rock, Reggae"
Donald Kinsey – guitar overdubs on "Johnny Was" and "Roots, Rock, Reggae"

Source: The Jamaica Observer

Charts

Certifications

References

External links
Detailed examination of the original album and the deluxe edition on Wailers.co.uk.
Transcript of Haile Selassie's 1963 speech addressed to the United Nations, which was made into the song "War".
Sound recording of Selassie's speech, spoken in Amharic, but also interpreted in English.

1976 albums
Bob Marley and the Wailers albums
Island Records albums
Tuff Gong albums